The 2002 Montreal Alouettes finished in first place in the East Division with a 13–5–0–1 record. The Alouettes hired coach Don Matthews, after a terrible ending to the 2001 season. They defeated the Toronto Argonauts 35–18 in the East Final to advance to the Grey Cup. They met their most frequent Grey Cup partner, the Edmonton Eskimos, in front of a loud, cold, hometown Eskimo crowd, they won 25–16,  winning their first championship since 1977, when they defeated these same Edmonton Eskimos in the famous Ice Bowl at Olympic Stadium.

Offseason

CFL draft

Preseason

Regular season

Season Standings

Season Schedule

Roster

Playoffs

Scotiabank East Final

Grey Cup

Awards

2002 CFL All-Star Selections
Anthony Calvillo – Quarterback
Uzooma Okeke – Offensive Tackle
Scott Flory – Offensive Guard
Bryan Chiu – Centre
Barron Miles – Defensive Back

2002 CFL Eastern All-Star Selections
Anthony calvillo – Quarterback
Ben Cahoon – Slotback
Pat Woodcock – Wide Receiver
Lawrence Phillips – Running Back
Marlion Jackson - Running Back
Uzooma okeke – Offensive Tackle
Scott flory – Offensive Guard
Bryan chiu – Centre
Marc Megna – Defensive End
Robert Brown – Defensive Tackle
Kevin Johnson – Linebacker
Stefen Reid – Linebacker
Barron miles – Defensive Back
Wayne Shaw – Cornerback
Keith Stokes – Special Teams

2002 Intergold CFLPA All-Star Selections

References

Montreal Alouettes
Montreal Alouettes seasons
James S. Dixon Trophy championship seasons
Grey Cup championship seasons
Montreal Alouettes Season, 2002